Liangqing District is one of 7 districts of the prefecture-level city of Nanning, the capital of Guangxi Zhuang Autonomous Region, South China. The district was approved to establish from parts of the former Yongning County by the Chinese State Council  on September 15, 2004.

References

External links 

County-level divisions of Guangxi
Nanning